Cave Valley may refer to:

Places
In the United States
Cave Valley, a former name of Cool, California
Cave Valley (Nevada), a valley in Nevada
Cave Valley, Nevada, a ghost town

Elsewhere
Cave Valley, Jamaica